Michael Hayden Walsh  (born 5 March 1938) is an Australian former radio and television presenter, currently focused on owning and operating live theatres, and theatre production both locally and the United Kingdom. Walsh was the first "King of Australian Daytime TV", with his program The Mike Walsh Show, featuring both local and international guests, including Hollywood performers.

Early life 
Walsh was born in Corowa, New South Wales. He completed his education at Xavier College in Melbourne, before studying pharmacy and arts at Melbourne University where he was heavily involved in student theatre revues.

Radio career 
Prior to starring on television Walsh was a disc jockey on 1260 3SR Shepparton and 3XY Melbourne, and a "Good Guy" on Sydney commercial radio station 2SM.

Television career
Walsh hosted The Mike Walsh Show from 1973 to 1985. The program screened originally on the 0-10 network, the forerunner of Network Ten, before transferring to the Nine Network. It won 24 Logies, with Walsh winning a Gold Logie.

The program was renowned for introducing fellow Gold Logie winning personality Jeanne Little in 1974.
The Mike Walsh Show became so popular in the midday time slot that it eventually moved to a night time format to try to reinvigorate night time variety.
 
The idea was to keep the midday show going but with a new host, whilst transferring the popularity of the Mike Walsh Show to the night time slot. Following speculation about who the host would be, Walsh announced on the midday show that, "there was only one choice for the new host and frankly if he had said no, we wouldn’t have gone to night time.  The host of the midday show for next year will be….Ray Martin".  The announcement was greeted with rapturous applause and cheering, perhaps due to Martin's popularity as a 60 Minutes reporter.  The Midday Show with Ray Martin ran for 13 years.
 
The night time show with Walsh was a failure and was cancelled after a few weeks. He returned to television for a 12-week chat and music show on the ABC in 1987.

He has the distinction of winning a Gold Logie and Sammy award in the same year. He has 24 Logies all up, and seven Sammys in total.

Theatre production
Walsh the executive producer of two highly successful musicals, Nunsense and Anything Goes.

From 2006, Walsh has spent time in both Sydney and London producing theatre shows across Australia and on London's West End. These include:

 Nunsense (late 1987 to early 1989)
 Anything Goes in 1989
 Exit the King (opened March 2009) at Ethel Barrymore Theatre, Broadway
 Holding the Man (opened May 2010) at the Trafalgar Studios 1, London
 Umbrellas of Cherbourg (opened March 2011) at the Gielgud Theatre, West End
 A Chorus Line (opened February 2013) at the London Palladium Theatre

In 1977 he purchased Richmond's Regent Theatre, then in 1982 built a twin cinema complex in Penrith. Thereafter, he purchased two other cinemas and the Avalon. He has been the owner of Her Majesty's Theatre in Melbourne since 2000, funding and overseeing its restoration. Walsh also owns the Hayden Orpheum Picture Palace (purchased 1986), a 1935 art deco six-cinema complex in Cremorne, Sydney which he restored at a cost of $2.5 million, and which features a 1925 Wurlitzer orchestral pipe organ.

Fellowships program
From 1996, Walsh financed the Mike Walsh Fellowships for young performers to hone their skills overseas and in Australia. From 2006 onwards, he has provided $50,000 (originally $30,000) each year for the fellowships. By 2015 this has added up to over $700,000 awarded to more than 90 Fellows.

Honours 
Walsh was honoured in 1980 with an award of the Order of the British Empire. In 2016 he was appointed a Member of the Order of Australia for significant service to the entertainment industry, and to the performing arts through support for young actors, theatre restoration and production.

References

External links
 Official website
 

1938 births
Living people
People from New South Wales
Australian radio personalities
Australian television presenters
Gold Logie winners
Australian Officers of the Order of the British Empire
University of Melbourne alumni
Television personalities from Melbourne
People educated at Xavier College
Members of the Order of Australia
Australian theatre owners
Film exhibitors